Catocala ulalume, the Ulalume underwing, is a moth of the family Erebidae. The species was first described by Herman Strecker in 1878. It is found in the United States from Virginia through Georgia to Florida, west to Texas and Oklahoma and north to Illinois.

The wingspan is 60–75 mm. Adults are on wing from June to September. There is one generation per year.

The larvae feed on Carya alba.

References

External links
Oehlke, Bill. "Catocala ulalume Strecker, 1878". The Catocala Website. Retrieved October 22, 2019.

Moths described in 1878
ulalume
Moths of North America